Paris Playboys is a 1954 American comedy film directed by William Beaudine and starring The Bowery Boys. The film was released on March 7, 1954 by Allied Artists and is the thirty-third film in the series.

Plot
After Sach is mistaken by French professor as the missing Prof. Maurice Gaston LeBeau, they convince him to impersonate the professor in the hopes of driving the real professor out of hiding.  Sach and Slip head off to Paris, along with Louie, and proceed with the plan, with everyone there thinking that the professor has amnesia.  The real professor finds out about his impostor and returns to Paris, just in time to encounter spies who are trying to steal the professor's rocket fuel formula that he was working on when he disappeared.  Sach, however, creates his own rocket formula that saves the day, and he is rewarded for his efforts in the end.

Cast

The Bowery Boys
Leo Gorcey as Terrance Aloysius 'Slip' Mahoney
Huntz Hall as Horace Debussy 'Sach' Jones/ Prof. Maurice Gaston LeBeau
David Gorcey as Chuck Anderson (Credited as David Condon)
Bennie Bartlett as Butch Williams

Remaining cast
Bernard Gorcey as Louie Dumbrowski
Veola Vonn as Mimi DuBoise
Steven Geray as Gaspard
John E. Wengraf as Vidal
Fritz Feld as Marcel

Production
After thirty two films in this series, the opening title screen was changed from "Starring Leo Gorcey and the Bowery Boys" to "Starring Leo Gorcey, Huntz Hall and the Bowery Boys" beginning with this film.

In the film, David Gorcey and Bennie Bartlett only appear in an early scene at Louie's Sweet Shop, and have no lines of dialogue.

Home media
Warner Archives released the film on made-to-order DVD in the United States as part of "The Bowery Boys, Volume Three" on October 1, 2013.

References

External links

1954 comedy films
1954 films
American black-and-white films
American comedy films
Bowery Boys films
Films directed by William Beaudine
1950s English-language films
Films set in Paris
Allied Artists films
1950s American films